Piz Lad is a mountain of the Sesvenna Range (Alps), located on the border between Italy and Switzerland. The tripoint between Austria, Italy and Switzerland (2,180 m) is located 800 m north of the summit.

References

External links
 Piz Lad on Hikr

Mountains of the Alps
International mountains of Europe
Mountains of Graubünden
Mountains of South Tyrol
Mountains of Tyrol (state)
Italy–Switzerland border
Austria–Switzerland border
Border tripoints
Mountains of Switzerland
Two-thousanders of Switzerland
Valsot